Sabri Gençsoy (born 1 January 1918) was a Turkish  association football player. He took a part of Beşiktaş J.K. roster along with iconic players of club, including Hakkı Yeten, Hüsnü Savman, Şeref Görkey, and Eşref Bilgiç, in 1940s.

Career

Gençsoy spent his entire career at Beşiktaş J.K. between 1938 and 1948 where he achieved numerous local titles, including 3 times Turkish National Division, top-level national football competition between 1937 and 1950. He was the regular right-half of the team at 1938–39 and 1939–40 seasons. In 1940–41 season, along with Hakkı Yeten and Şeref Görkey, Gençsoy contributed the team with 28 goals combined.

Honours
Beşiktaş
 Turkish National Division (3): 1941, 1944, 1947
 Istanbul Football League (7): 1938–39, 1939–40, 1940–41, 1941–42, 1942–43, 1944–45, 1945–46
 Istanbul Football Cup (2): 1944 1946
 Prime Minister's Cup (1): 1947

References
Citations

 Books

External links
 Sabri Gençsoy at Soccerway
 Sabri Gençsoy at Maçkolik

1918 births
Year of death missing
Turkish footballers
Association football forwards
Süper Lig players
Beşiktaş J.K. footballers